The 460th Operations Support Squadron (460 OSS) was a United States Space Force unit. Assigned to Space Operations Command's Space Delta 4, it provided operational training and certification of all space professional assigned to the delta. It was headquartered at Buckley Space Force Base, Colorado.

On 11 March 2022, the squadron was inactivated with its mission absorbed by the delta's staff.

List of commanders 

 Lt Col Robert B. Riegel, July 2012
 Lt Col Timothy J. Bos, July 2014 – July 2016
 Lt Col Paul Freeman, ~2018
 Lt Col Jason M. McCandless, 28 June 2018 – July 2020
 Lt Col Carrie Zederkof, ~July 2020 – July 2020

See also 
 Space Delta 4

References

External links 
 

Military education and training in the United States
Squadrons of the United States Space Force